The Shadow I Remember is the seventh studio album by American rock band Cloud Nothings. It was released on February 26, 2021 via Carpark Records.

Background
The album was recorded at Electrical Audio in Chicago, Illinois, with record producer Steve Albini.

Release
On October 13, 2020, Cloud Nothings announced the release of the new album, which they had written while in quarantine during the COVID-19 pandemic.

Singles
The first single to be released from the album, "Am I Something," was announced on the same day as the album details.

On November 17, 2020, "The Spirit Of" was announced as the second single.

The band released the third single, "Nothing Without You," on February 3, 2021. In a press release, lead vocalist Dylan Baldi said the song "explores both the negative and positive aspects of dependency, whether it be on a person, a place, an object, or nothing at all."

Critical reception

The Shadow I Remember was met with "generally favorable" reviews from critics. At Metacritic, which assigns a weighted average rating out of 100 to reviews from mainstream publications, this release received an average score of 77 based on 13 reviews. At AnyDecentMusic?, the website gave the album a 7.3 out of 10 based on 10 reviews.

Writing for AllMusic, Heather Phares gave the release a 4.5 out of 5, explaining "The Shadow I Remember'''s compact, hooky outbursts are just as potent as the slow-burning epics on Cloud Nothings' other albums. They're so seasoned that they can shift from bouncy to crushing and back again in a blink on "The Spirit Of," or whip through a dramatic buildup, blistering choruses, and a radiant coda in 90 seconds on "It's Love." In a review for The Line of Best Fit'', Ben Lynch gave a mixed review for the album, noting the music is "typically replete with hooks and furious one-liners", and the band should "reassess once more before they head into the studio again."

Track listing

Personnel
Adapted from Allmusic.

Cloud Nothings

 Dylan Baldi – lead vocals, backing vocals, rhythm guitar
 Chris Brown – lead guitar, keyboards, backing vocals
 TJ Duke – bass, backing vocals
 Jayson Gerycz – drums

Additional personnel

 Steve Albini – engineering, production
 Rob Carmichael – design, layout
 Brett Naucke – synthesizer
 Greg Obis – mixing, mastering
 Macie Stewart – vocals

References

External links 
 The Shadow I Remember on Bandcamp
 

2021 albums
Cloud Nothings albums
Carpark Records albums
Wichita Recordings albums